Leif Olson (born July 17, 1981) is an American professional golfer who currently plays on the PGA Tour.

Olson was born in Denver, Colorado. He played college golf from 1999 to 2003 at Duke University.

Professional career
Olson earned his 2009 PGA Tour card through 2008 Q-School. In his first 14 events on tour, Olson only made three cuts. Olson won a BMW Z4 Roadster at the 2009 RBC Canadian Open when he recorded a hole in one on the 15th hole at Glen Abbey Golf Course. It was a very bizarre hole in one. Olson's ball landed past the hole, rolled down the slope towards the hole and deflected off another player's ball which redirected it into the cup.

Olson finished a career-best third place at the Turning Stone Resort Championship in 2009, just one stroke out of a playoff that was won by Matt Kuchar.

Results in major championships

DNP = Did not play
CUT = missed the half-way cut
"T" = tied
Green background for wins. Yellow background for top-10.

See also
 2008 PGA Tour Qualifying School graduates

External links
 
 Olson's hole in one

American male golfers
Duke Blue Devils men's golfers
PGA Tour golfers
Golfers from Denver
Golfers from Scottsdale, Arizona
1981 births
Living people